Raipur is the capital city of the Indian state of Chhattisgarh. Raipur is also the administrative headquarters of Raipur district and Raipur division, and the largest city of the state. It was a part of Madhya Pradesh before the state of Chhattisgarh was formed on 1 November 2000. It is a major commercial hub for trade and commerce in the region. It has exponential industrial growth and has become a major business hub in Central India. It has been ranked as India's 6th cleanest city as per the Swachh Survekshan for the year 2021. Raipur is ranked 7th in the Ease of Living Index 2019 and 7th in the Municipal Performance Index 2020, both by the Ministry of Housing and Urban Affairs (MoHUA).

Raipur is also regarded as one of the best cities to do business. It is abundantly rich in mineral resources, and is among the biggest producers of steel and iron in the country. There are about 200 steel rolling mills, 195 sponge iron plants, at least 6 steel plants, 60 plywood factories, 35 ferro-alloy plants and 500 agro-industries in the city. In addition, Raipur also has over 800 rice milling plants.

History  
The earliest archaeological evidence from old sites and ruins of the fort indicate that Raipur has existed since at least the 9th century. However, there is enough literary evidence that defines the history of Raipur since the time of the Maurya Empire. Raipur district was once part of Southern Kosal and considered to be under the Maurya Empire. Raipur had later been the capital of the Haihaya Kings, controlling the traditional forts of Chhattisgarh for a long time. Satawahana Kings ruled this part till the 2nd-3rd century CE. Samudragupta had conquered this region in the fourth century, but the region came under the sway of Sarabhpuri Kings and then Nala Kings in the 5th and 6th centuries. Later on, Somavanshi kings had taken control over this region and ruled with Sirpur as their capital city. The Kalchuri Kings of Tumman ruled this part for a long time making Ratanpur as capital. It is believed that the King Ramachandra of this dynasty established the city of Raipur and subsequently made it the capital of his kingdom.

Another story about Raipur is that King Ramachandra's son Brahmdeo Rai had established the city. His capital was Khalwatika (now Khallari). The newly constructed city was named after Brahmdeo Rai as 'Raipur'. It was during this time in 1402 CE. that the temple of Hatkeshwar Mahadev was constructed on the banks of the river Kharun, which remains one of the oldest landmarks in Raipur. After the death of king Amarsingh Deo, this region had become the domain of the Bhonsle Kings of Nagpur.
With the death of Raghuji the III, the territory was assumed by the British government from the Bhonsle Kings and Chhattisgarh was declared a separate Commission with its headquarters at Raipur in 1854. After independence, the Raipur district was included in the Central Provinces and Berar. Raipur district became a part of Madhya Pradesh on 1 November 1956 and subsequently became a part of Chhattisgarh on 1 November 2000 with Raipur becoming the capital of the new state.

Demographics 

 2011 census, Raipur Municipal Corporation had a population of 1,010,087, of which 519,286 are males and 490,801 are females—a sex ratio of 945 females per 1000 males, higher than the national average of 940 per 1000. 124,471 children are in the age group of 0–6 years, of which 64,522 are boys and 59,949 are girls—a ratio of 929 girls per 1000 boys. There are 769,593 literates (420,155 males, 349,438 females). The effective literacy was 86.90%; male literacy was 92.39% and female literacy was 81.10%, significantly higher than the national average of 73.00%.

The urban agglomeration had a population of 1,122,555, of which males constitute 578,339, females constitute 544,216—a sex ratio of 941 females per 1000 males and 142,826 children are in the age group of 0–6 years. There are a total of 846,952 literates with an effective literacy rate of 86.45%.

Geography and climate

Geography 
Raipur is located near the centre of a large plain, sometimes referred to as the "rice bowl of India", where hundreds of varieties of rice are grown. The Mahanadi River flows to the east of the city of Raipur, and the southern side has dense forests. The Maikal Hills rise on the north-west of Raipur; on the north, the land rises and merges with the Chota Nagpur Plateau, which extends north-east across Jharkhand state. On the south of Raipur lies the Deccan Plateau.

Climate 
Raipur has a tropical wet and dry climate, temperatures remain moderate throughout the year, except from March to June, which can be extremely hot. The temperature in April–May sometimes rises above . These summer months also have dry and hot winds.
Winters last from November to January and are mild, although lows can fall to  making it reasonably cold.

Government and politics

Civic administration 
Raipur city has a Municipal corporation. It was initially established by the British on 17 May 1867, initially named Raipur Municipal committee. It was upgraded to Raipur Municipal Corporation in the year 1973. The area of the municipal corporation is 226 km2 (87 sq mi). RMC is governed under the guidelines mentioned in the Chhattisgarh Municipalities Act, 1961. As per the 2011 Census of India, the urban agglomeration population in Raipur, Durg-Bhilai was 3,186,632. The three urban cities of Raipur, Bhilai and Durg in the west central region of Chhattisgarh together create the Raipur-Bhilai-Durg Tri City Metro area.

The functions under the municipal corporation are the construction of health centres, educational institutes, schools, and periodic maintenance of the houses. In addition to taking the responsibility of constructing basic civic infrastructure, flyovers, and roads, it is also developing recreational centres such as museums, community halls, and parks. Along with basic civic infrastructure, flyovers, and roads.

The executive committee consists of the Commissioner, Deputy commissioner, city health officers, executive engineers, zone commissioners, and other staff. The Municipal Commissioner of Raipur is Shri. Saurabh Kumar (I.A.S). The current mayor is Aijaz Dhebar from INC. The Mayor in the council consists of the Mayor who is the ex officio chairperson of the MIC. Among elected councillors, the mayor elects them to the council. There are 70 wards and 8 zones within the Raipur Municipal Corporation. The zonal ward committees are headed by chairpersons who are elected by ward councillors of the respective zone.

The recent municipal elections were held on 21 December 2019. The political parties in the majority at the municipal level are BJP and INC. The estimated municipal budget the 2017-2018 period is  2,612,667. Key revenue sources are tax income, fees and charges, sanitation charges, grants and donations, and capital income.

The city is a part of Raipur District with S. Bharathi Dasan, IAS/Collector and DM. The collector heads the district administration department. The upper collector, deputy collector and joint deputy assist the Collector. Other governing agencies that are active in the city of Raipur is the Urban Administration And Development, Chhattisgarh.

Master plan 
Raipur Master Plan 2021 recognizes the need for planned development to take the pressure off the downtown core and meet the need for green spaces and bodies of water in that area. The plan calls for dense housing in new subdivisions on the outskirts and well-planned high-rise commercial and industrial development along with the NH-6 as well as on the north side of the city.

Legislative assembly and state agencies 
Raipur is a Lok Sabha/Parliamentary constituency in central Chhattisgarh. Raipur's Lok Sabha seat is unreserved. Sunil Kumar Soni of BJP is the current Member of Parliament, Lok Sabha from the city. There are seven Vidhan Sabha seats in Raipur district, including three in Raipur City, one in Raipur Rural and three in Outer Tehsils.

Economy 
Raipur, being the capital city of Chhattisgarh, has attracted large amounts of industrial development. As it is the state capital, the government and service sectors makes up a large part of the city's economy and workforce. Manufacturing industries are also well developed in the city, with a large number of industrial zones. Raipur is also regarded as one of the best cities to do business. It is abundantly rich in mineral resources, and is among the biggest producers of steel and iron in the country. There are about 200 steel rolling mills, 195 sponge iron plants, at least 6 steel plants, 60 plywood factories, 35 ferro-alloy plants and 500 agro-industries in the city. In addition, Raipur also has over 800 rice milling plants.

Dalmia Cement (Bharat) is planning to set up an integrated cement manufacturing unit with a capacity of 2.5 million TPA in Raipur. A South Korean multinational Sung Ha Telecom is also planning to set up a plant in Naya Raipur. JSW Steel has a steel plant in Raipur. APL Apollo's in joint venture with a Singaporean company has planned a manufacturing plant in Raipur. Grasim Industries operates a cement plant at Rewan in Raipur. Ambuja Cements has a plant in Bhatapara. In addition, Raipur has a large chemical plant which produces and supplies formalin all throughout the country. LPG bottling plants owned by Bharat Petroleum and Hindustan Petroleum are also in Raipur. Godavari - E - Mobility is planning to set up a manufacturing plant in the city as well. A heavy machinery plant of Jindal Group is in Raipur.

Functioning as an information technology (IT) and cyber hub, a technology park in Chhattisgarh's new capital city Naya Raipur was built. Chhattisgarh State Industrial Development Corporation (CSIDC) will be developing a new industrial area in Tilda near Raipur to provide facilities for small and medium industries. Two new industrial parks for apparel and metal industries are coming up in Raipur.

Civic utilities

Transport services 
The superintendent of Engineers Executive Engineers, the team of Engineers, and the staff responsible for the related activities of the road department head the public works department. Their purposes are planning and designing of road stormwater drains, maintenance of roads and streets, maintenance of gardens and parks, resurfacing the roads, and repairing potholes and bad patches.

In the bus transport system of Raipur City there is a total number of 157 buses plying within the city.

Fire service and electricity 
The city's electricity is supplied by Chhattisgarh State Power Distribution Company Limited. Fire and emergency services were set up in 2016 to protect fire incidents in the state. As per the directions of the government, the Fire Station of the urban body are being taken under fire and emergency services.

Water, drainage and sewerage 
The existing source of unfiltered water is from the Kharun river, and about 170 million litres of water per day (MLD) is treated on a daily basis, and the plant has a treatment capacity of 275 MLD. The per capita water supply in the city of Raipur is 135 litres per day. There is a water supply connection serving a total of 50,000 households. Along with water from the Kharun River (27 MLD), another source of water is groundwater, and the capacity utilized is 22 MLD. There is a total of 1,133 handpumps in the city.

There is a lack in the sewerage systems of Raipur City. The data for households with a Sewerage Network is unavailable, but the number of households with septic tanks are 1,44,882 and the households without any outlets for toilets is 5,649. The city has no separate drainage system nor any sewer lines. There is a separate stormwater drainage system, laid as per requirement.

Solid waste management 
The waste management in the city is entrusted with the city health officer, the in-charge health officer, zonal health officer, and the team of sanitary supervisors and ward supervisors. A total of 3,56,490 households have been successful with source segregation and are covered by door-to-door collection. Raipur's major waste disposal site is the Sarona site, which is 12 km away from the city centre.

Transport

Roadways

Some major roads in Raipur are  National Highway 53 (NH-53), National Highway 30 (NH-30), Great Eastern Road, Pandri Road, Baloda Bazar Road, Nardha Raipur Road, VIP Road, and Atal Path Expressway.

The Raipur–Naya Raipur Expressway, also known as Atal Path Expressway, is a  access-controlled expressway connecting Raipur to Naya Raipur. It has been made to ease the traffic on the GE road and provide faster access to Dhamtari road from Raipur railway station. It serves 4 flyovers and 1 elevated corridor, crossing over GE road and NH-53 in between two ends of expressway.

The proposed Durg–Raipur–Arang Expressway and the under-construction Raipur–Visakhapatnam Expressway will pass through and start from Raipur, which after completion, will enhance connectivity and commute further with other cities to and from Raipur.

Bus transport

A recently constructed bus station, the Sri Balaji Swami Trust Sri Dudhadhari Math Inter State Bus Terminal, or ISBT Raipur, is located at Ravanbhantha, and is the main bus station of the city. It has replaced the old Minimata Bus Stand or Pandri Stand, which was creating heavy traffic problems. The services of the new ISBT started on 15 November 2021. The only bus rapid transit system is the Raipur and Naya Raipur BRTS.

Metro
A light rail, or a Metrolite or Lite Metro (as referred in India), has been proposed by the Government of Chhattisgarh, which will run from Naya Raipur to Durg via Raipur and Bhilai.

Railways 

Raipur Junction railway station is the primary railway station of the city, which is situated on the Howrah-Nagpur-Mumbai line of the Indian Railways, running through the cities of Bhusawal, Nagpur, Gondia, Bilaspur, Rourkela and Kharagpur. Thus, it is connected with most major cities of India. It is categorized in the A-1 category of railway stations by the Indian Railways. Some small railway stations are also present here for local trains like Sarona, Saraswati Nagar, and WRS Colony railway stations. They also lie on the same railway route.

Airport 

Swami Vivekananda Airport, or Mana Airport, is the primary airport serving the state of Chhattisgarh. The airport is well-connected, having daily direct flights to Mumbai, Delhi, Kolkata, Bangalore, Pune, Chennai, Goa, Lucknow, Indore, Jaipur, Patna, Ahmedabad, Bhopal, Bhubaneswar, Hyderabad, Prayagraj, and Jagdalpur, operated by Alliance Air, IndiGo and Vistara airlines.

List of mayors

Points of Interest 

 Mata Kaushalya Temple only temple in the world dedicated to Mata Kaushalya
 Purkhouti Muktangan, Naya Raipur  an open air Cultural garden that exhibits Culture of Chhattisgarh
 Nandanvan Jungle Safari, Naya Raipur Asia's largest man-made Jungle Safari
 Ram Mandir, Raipur temple dedicated to lord Ram
 Guru Ghasi Das Sangrahalya a museum in Raipur
 Swami Vivekananda Sarowar (Budha Talab)
 Telibandha Lake (A promenade alongside lake, famous for hanging out and food joints)

Education 
Raipur has become a big educational hub of Chhattisgarh due to the presence of many institutes of national importance in engineering, management, medical and law, including IIM, NIT, AIIMS, Hidayatullah National Law University (HNLU), CIPET, Raipur, NIPER(Proposed) and IIIT.

Premier institutes 

All India Institute of Medical Sciences, Raipur (AIIMS) 
Central Institute of Petrochemicals Engineering and Technology
Hidayatullah National Law University
Indian Institute of Management Raipur (IIM)
International Institute of Information Technology, Naya Raipur
National Institute of Malaria Research
National Institute of Technology, Raipur(NIT)
National Institutes of Pharmaceutical Education and Research (NIPER} (Proposed) at Naya Raipur

Government universities 

Chandulal Chandrakar Patrakarita Avam Jansanchar Vishwavidyalaya
Chhattisgarh Kamdhenu Vishwavidyalaya
Chhattisgarh Swami Vivekanand Technical University
Pandit Ravishankar Shukla University
Pt. Deendayal Upadhyay Memorial Health Sciences and Ayush University of Chhattisgarh

Private universities and deemed universities 

Amity University
ICFAI University
ITM University
Kalinga University
MATS University

Commerce, engineering and management colleges 

Government Engineering College (GEC)
Pragati College of Engineering and Management
Raipur Institute of Technology
Shri Shankaracharya Institute of Professional Management and Technology (SSIPMT)

Secondary education 

 Bharatiya Vidya Bhavan
 DAV Public School
 Kendriya Vidyalaya
 Rajkumar College, established 1882
 Ryan International School
 Delhi Public School

Media

News channels 
Many local news channels are telecast from Raipur in Hindi:

Newspapers 
Many national and local newspapers are published from Raipur in both Hindi and English:

Radio 
Raipur city has five FM Radio Stations -

Notable people 

Lucky Ali, Bollywood singer/composer/actor, did a part of his schooling from Rajkumar College, Raipur
Teejan Bai, traditional performing artist for Pandavani.
Anurag Basu, noted Bollywood movie director, born in Raipur and later moved to the neighboring city of Bhilai.
Harinath De, Indian historian, scholar, and a polyglot, later became the first Indian librarian of the National Library of India (then Imperial Library), spent his childhood and did his initial schooling in Raipur.
Mohammad Hidayatullah, former Chief Justice of India and former acting president of India, received his primary education at the Government High School of Raipur until 1922.
Akhtar Husain, Pakistani scholar, journalist and lexicographer.
Harshad Mehta, infamous stockbroker, spent his childhood in Raipur after his parents moved here from Mumbai.
Shekhar Sen, musical mono-act player, born and raised in Raipur.
Ravishankar Shukla, the first chief minister of the state of Madhya Pradesh, spent his childhood and was educated in Raipur.
Vidya Charan Shukla, former Union Minister and a nine-term parliamentarian, born in Raipur
Veer Narayan Singh, freedom fighter, jailed at Raipur by the British Army.
K. S. Sudarshan, former chief of the Rashtriya Swayamsevak Sangh, born in Raipur in 1931.
Habib Tanvir, noted theatre artist and playwright, born in Raipur in 1923.
Swami Vivekananda spent two of his teenage years in Raipur from 1877 till 1879 when his father was transferred here.

See also 
 Naya Raipur
 Shaheed Veer Narayan Singh International Cricket Stadium
 Samta colony
 Raman Singh
 Bhupesh Baghel

References

External links 

 Raipur District Administration
 DPR Chhattisgarh
 DPR Raipur District

Metropolitan cities in India
Articles containing potentially dated statements from 2011
All articles containing potentially dated statements
Cities and towns in Raipur district
 
Smart cities in India
Former capital cities in India